Skye Gyngell (born 6 September 1963), is an Australian chef who is best known for her work as food editor for Vogue, and for winning a Michelin star at the Petersham Nurseries Cafe. She first trained as a chef in France, and afterwards moved to Britain.

Early life
Gyngell was born in Sydney. Her father was Bruce Gyngell, an Australian television executive.

Career
Gyngell trained at La Varenne restaurant in Paris, France, under chef Anne Willan. She then moved to work at the Dodin-Bouffant restaurant before going to work at The French House, in Soho, London. She went on to work at The Dorchester under Anton Mosimann. She cooked for dinner parties, including for celebrity chef Nigella Lawson.

She joined the Petersham Nurseries Cafe as head chef at its opening in 2004, having convinced the owners of the nurseries to allow her to create the "antithesis of a West End restaurant" there. The restaurant was set in the grounds of Petersham House. The restaurant was awarded a Michelin star in the 2011 list, and she created a pop-up restaurant in London in conjunction with Cloudy Bay wines later in the year. After eight years at the Cafe, she left the restaurant in 2012. In interviews she explained that she didn't like the expectations that people had of a Michelin-starred restaurant and this led to her decision to quit, and described the star as a "curse", stating, "If I ever have another restaurant I pray we don't get a star." She explained later that she regretted her comments about the Michelin star, but thought that the set up at Petersham just didn't allow for the expectations of customers to be met, describing the facilities as "cooking out of a garage".

Later that year she announced a collaboration with Heckfield Place, and was named Culinary Director for the three restaurants there. In addition, she is being backed by the same investors to head a new restaurant in London. She has already said that she would not turn down a star should one come along. She had declined offers to run the kitchens of Kensington Place restaurant and the café of the Serpentine Gallery.

In November 2014, she opened Spring, a restaurant at Somerset House.

She has written for The Independent on Sunday, and has been the food editor for magazine Vogue.

Personal life
Gyngell has two children and was married to Thomas Gore between 1989 and 1996.

Published works

References

External links
Official website

1963 births
Living people
People from Sydney
Australian chefs
Women chefs
Head chefs of Michelin starred restaurants
Australian expatriates in France
Australian expatriates in England